The Ukrainian national ice hockey team is the national men's ice hockey team of Ukraine, and is controlled by the Ice Hockey Federation of Ukraine, and a member of the International Ice Hockey Federation (IIHF). Ukraine is currently ranked 27th in the world by the IIHF as of the 2020 IIHF World Ranking, while their highest IIHF ranking is 11th.

The team's top finish was at the 2002 World Championships when they finished in 9th place. Following the 2007 IIHF World Championship in Russia, Ukraine was relegated to Division I.

Tournament record

Olympic Games
2002 – Finished in 10th place

World Championship
1954–1991 – Participated as part of the Soviet Union national ice hockey team
1993 – Finished in 18th place (2nd in Pool C)
1994 – Finished in 23rd place (3rd in Pool C1)
1995 – Finished in 23rd place (3rd in Pool C1)
1996 – Finished in 22nd place (2nd in Pool C)
1997 – Finished in 21st place (1st in Pool C, promoted to Pool B)
1998 – Finished in 17th place (1st in Pool B, promoted to Pool A)
1999 – Finished in 14th place
2000 – Finished in 14th place
2001 – Finished in 10th place
2002 – Finished in 9th place
2003 – Finished in 12th place
2004 – Finished in 14th place
2005 – Finished in 11th place
2006 – Finished in 12th place
2007 – Finished in 16th place (relegated to Division I)
2008 – Finished in 19th place (2nd in Division I Group B)
2009 – Finished in 20th place (2nd in Division I Group B)
2010 – Finished in 19th place (2nd in Division I Group A)
2011 – Finished in 21st place (3rd in Division I Group B)
2012 – Finished in 22nd place (6th in Division I Group A, relegated to Division I Group B)
2013 – Finished in 23rd place (1st in Division I Group B, promoted to Division I Group A)
2014 – Finished in 20th place (4th in Division I Group A)
2015 – Finished in 22nd place (6th in Division I Group A, relegated to Division I Group B)
2016 – Finished in 23rd place (1st in Division I Group B, promoted to Division I Group A)
2017 – Finished in 22nd place (6th in Division I Group A, relegated to Division I Group B)
2018 – Finished in 26th place (4th in Division I Group B)
2019 – Finished in 27th place (5th in Division I Group B)
2020 – Cancelled due to the COVID-19 pandemic
2021 – Cancelled due to the COVID-19 pandemic
2022 – Finished in 24th place (3rd in Division I Group B)

Coaches
 Oleksandr Fadeiev (1993–1994)
 Anatoliy Bohdanov (1994–2003)
 Oleksandr Seukand (2004–2007)
 Vladimir Golubovych (2007–2008)
 Oleksandr Seukand (2009)
 Mikhail Zakharov (2009–2010)
 Dave Lewis (2010–2011)
 Anatoliy Khomenko (2011–2012)
 Oleksandr Kulikov (2012–2013)
 Andrei Nazarov (2013–2014)
/ Oleksandr Hodyniuk (2014–15)
 Oleksandr Savytskyi (2015–2018)
 Andriy Sryubko (2018–2019)
/ Sergei Viter (2019–2020)
 Vadym Shakhraychuk (2021–Present)

Gallery

References

External links
 (in Ukrainian)
IIHF profile
National Teams of Ice Hockey

 

National ice hockey teams in Europe